The New Hanover Township School District is a consolidated public school district that serves students in pre-kindergarten through eighth grade from non-military portions of New Hanover Township (including its Cookstown section) and Wrightstown, two communities in Burlington County, New Jersey, United States.

As of the 2019–20 school year, the district, comprised of one school, had an enrollment of 180 students and 21.8 classroom teachers (on an FTE basis), for a student–teacher ratio of 8.3:1. In the 2016-17 school year, the district had the 40th-smallest enrollment of any school district in the state.

The district is classified by the New Jersey Department of Education as being in District Factor Group "B", the second lowest of eight groupings. District Factor Groups organize districts statewide to allow comparison by common socioeconomic characteristics of the local districts. From lowest socioeconomic status to highest, the categories are A, B, CD, DE, FG, GH, I and J.

For ninth through twelfth grades, students from both New Hanover Township and Wrightstown attend Bordentown Regional High School as part of a sending/receiving relationship with the Bordentown Regional School District, a regional K-12 school district that serves students from Bordentown City, Bordentown Township and Fieldsboro Borough. As of the 2019–20 school year, the high school had an enrollment of 791 students and 57.0 classroom teachers (on an FTE basis), for a student–teacher ratio of 13.9:1.

Attendance boundary
The district only includes portions of the township not on the property of Joint Base McGuire–Dix–Lakehurst. Students living on the base have choices of three school districts, none of them being New Hanover schools.

School
New Hanover Township School had an enrollment of 177 students in grades PreK-8 as of the 2019–20 school year.
Dr. Scott Larkin, Principal

Administration
Core members of the district's administration are:
Dr. Scott Larkin, Superintendent
Vincent Caravello, Business Administrator / Board Secretary

Board of education
The district's board of education, comprised of seven members, sets policy and oversees the fiscal and educational operation of the district through its administration. As a Type II school district, the board's trustees are elected directly by voters to serve three-year terms of office on a staggered basis, with either two or three seats up for election each year held (since 2012) as part of the November general election. The board appoints a superintendent to oversee the day-to-day operation of the district.

References

External links 
New Hanover Township Public Schools

School Data for the New Hanover Township School, National Center for Education Statistics

New Jersey District Factor Group B
New Hanover Township, New Jersey
School districts in Burlington County, New Jersey
Public K–8 schools in New Jersey